Anthidium cingulatum is a species of bee in the family Megachilidae, the leaf-cutter bees or mason bees which is found in south and central Europe east to Siberia and south to North Africa and Iran. It feeds on the nectar and pollen of plants in the families Asteraceae, Fabaceae and Lamiaceae while males have been recorded as pollinators of the lizard orchid Himantoglossum caprinum in Crimea.

References

cingulatum
Insects described in 1809